Chang Gewog (Dzongkha: ལྕང་) is a gewog (village block) of Thimphu District, Bhutan.

References

Gewogs of Bhutan
Thimphu District